William Penn Thompson (January 14, 1874 – May 12, 1960) was an American Negro league outfielder in the 1900s.

A native of Louisa County, Virginia, Thompson began his baseball career playing for the Concord, New Hampshire YMCA team in 1891 and went on to play for the Cuban Giants in 1900 and later the Philadelphia Giants. He remained in Concord most of his life, and in 1960 the city named a local park in his honor. Thompson died in Boston, Massachusetts in 1960 at age 86.

References

External links
Baseball statistics and player information from Baseball-Reference Black Baseball Stats and Seamheads

1874 births
1960 deaths
Cuban Giants players
Baseball outfielders
Baseball players from Virginia
People from Louisa County, Virginia
20th-century African-American people